European route E44 is an intermediate E-road. Its route is Le Havre – Amiens – Charleville-Mézières – Luxembourg – Trier – Koblenz – Wetzlar – Gießen

References

External links 
 UN Economic Commission for Europe: Overall Map of E-road Network (2007)

E044
E044
E044
E044
44